The 2011 SAP Open was a tennis tournament played on indoor hard courts. It was the 123rd edition of the SAP Open, and was part of the ATP World Tour 250 series of the 2011 ATP World Tour. It took place at the HP Pavilion in San Jose, California, United States, from February 7 through February 13, 2011.

On the opening night of the event, Gaël Monfils defeated Pete Sampras 7–6(4), 6–4 in an exhibition match.  Gaël Monfils was forced to withdraw with a left wrist injury prior to his semifinal match against Milos Raonic.  Following Monfils' withdrawal, Raonic played an exhibition match against Ivo Karlović, who won the match 7–6(3), 7–6(7). Unseeded Raonic eventually faced Fernando Verdasco in the final, and went on to win his first ATP World Tour career title.

Singles main draw entrants

Seeds 

1 Rankings as of January 31, 2011.

Other entrants 
The following players received wildcards into the main draw:
  Bradley Klahn
  Rajeev Ram
  Tim Smyczek

The following players received entry from the qualifying draw:

  Roman Borvanov
  Robert Farah
  Alex Kuznetsov
  Jesse Levine

Finals

Singles 

 Milos Raonic defeated  Fernando Verdasco, 7–6(8–6), 7–6(7–5).
It was Raonic's first career title. He was the first Canadian to win a title since Greg Rusedski won Seoul in 1995.

Doubles 

 Scott Lipsky /  Rajeev Ram defeated  Alejandro Falla /  Xavier Malisse, 6–4, 4–6, [10–8].

References

External links
 Official website

 
SAP Open
SAP Open
SAP Open
SAP Open
SAP Open